Chibolo (sometimes spelled Chivolo) is a town and municipality of the Colombian Department of Magdalena. Chibolo was founded in 1820 and became a municipality 
on March 8, 1974. Its economy is based on farming, but also attracts by having a historic church of Saint Catherine of Alexandria (Iglesia Santa Catalina de Alejandría) and the Santa Catalina Plaza (Saint Catherine Plaza). Chibolo celebrated Carnivals, the Christian Holy Week, Day of Maria Auxiliadora every May 24, Virgen del Carmen, Saint Judas Thaddeus, town celebration of Saint Catherine of Alexandria on December 25.

 Population : 18,584
 Rural: 7,614
 Urban: 10, 970
 Area: 528 km².
 Elevation: 26 meters, with higher elevation reaching less than 100 meters
 Physical characteristics: river valleys and some small hills.  
 Agriculture: Livestock raising, yuca, and corn 
 Points of interest''':
 Church of Santa Catalina de Alejandría
 Los Pocitos (Lloradera)
 Plaza de Santa Catalina.
 Quebrado la Chimicuica

Corregimientos
 La China
 La Estrella
 Pueblo Nuevo

References

External links
 Gobernacion del Magdalena – Chibolo

Municipalities of Magdalena Department